The London Borough of Merton is an outer London borough in the south west of the conurbation. Merton's parks and open spaces range in size from Mitcham Common and a major part of Wimbledon Common to the smaller gardens, sports grounds and recreation grounds within its boundaries.

The major areas of public open space in the Borough are:

 Cannizaro Park, Wimbledon: 
 Cannon Hill Common, Morden: ,
 Crooked Billet
 Figges Marsh, Mitcham: 
 Joseph Hood Recreation Ground, Morden: 
 King George's Playing Field, Morden: 
 Mitcham Common: 
 Morden Park: 
 Morden Hall Park: , National Trust property
 Morden Recreation Ground: 
 Ravensbury Park, Mitcham: 
 Sir Joseph Hood Memorial Playing Field, Motspur Park: , includes nature conservation area
 Wandle Park 
 Wimbledon Common, 460 hectares (1,140 acres) 
 Wimbledon Park:

References

External links
 Merton parks and recreation grounds
 Merton's 13 nature reserves
 Mitcham Common
 Wimbledon Common

 
Merton, Parks and open spaces